Railroad Tigers is a 2016 Chinese action comedy film directed by Ding Sheng and starring Jackie Chan. It was released in China on December 23, 2016. The film is about a railroad worker who leads a team of freedom fighters to oppose the Japanese during the occupation in World War II. The film performed well at the box office.

Plot
In December 1941, Japan expands the occupation of its neighbouring countries to Southeast Asia. The railway from Tianjin to Nanjing in East China became a key military transportation route, heavily guarded by Japanese soldiers. Railroad worker Ma Yuan (Jackie Chan) leads a team of freedom fighters. Using his deep knowledge of the train network, he and his men sabotage it, ambushing Japanese soldiers and stealing supplies to feed the starving Chinese. Although the freedom fighters have no weapons of their own, they employ whatever tools are at hand, including a hammer and shovels, loose railway track planks and diverted trains.  The local Chinese call the unlikely heroes the “Railroad Tigers”. The freedom fighters find themselves on the wrong side of the tracks when the Japanese send reinforcements to Shandong. In an act of defiance, Ma Yuan launches his most dangerous mission yet, blowing up a heavily guarded railroad bridge. When the Japanese learn of the crippling plan, which will derail the war effort, the stakes are raised even higher. After many missed opportunities and missed shots, the bridge is blown up by the ragtag Chinese railroad tigers.

Cast
Jackie Chan as Ma Yuan
Huang Zitao as Da Hai 
Wang Kai as Fan Chuan
Darren Wang as Da Guo 
Sang Ping as Dakui
Xu Fan as Auntie Qin
Jaycee Chan as Rui Ge
Hiroyuki Ikeuchi as Captain Yamaguchi (Japanese: 陸軍大尉山口, Rikugun-Tai-i Yamaguchi)
Zhang Lanxin as Yuko
Andy Lau as School Teacher (cameo)

Production
The film had railway sequences shot in Diaobingshan using steam trains.

Release
On September 1, 2016, Well Go Entertainment announced the acquisition of Railroad Tigers for distribution in English-language territories including North America, the United Kingdom, Australia and New Zealand. The film opened in December to coincide with its release in China.

Reception
The film grossed  on its opening weekend in China. It has grossed  in China. , the film holds a 38% approval rating on review aggregator website Rotten Tomatoes, based on 34 reviews with an average rating of 5.49/10. The site's critical consensus reads: "Railroad Tigers throws a few sparks hearkening back to Jackie Chan's glory days as an action comedy star, but they're smothered by an unfocused story and jarring shifts in tone."

Peter DeBruge of Variety criticized Railroad Tigers as "instantly forgettable" and "a tired, often incomprehensible mess". Nick Allen of RogerEbert.com gave the film one and a half out of four stars, criticizing it as unengaging with both the lack of tension and mishandled tonal combination of slapstick comedy with seriousness, stating that "[Railroad Tigers] doesn’t have the finesse to pull off a more innocent riff on [Inglourious Basterds]." Fellow RogerEbert.com critic Simon Abrams, however, considered the film to be superior to Chan's later film The Foreigner.

Clarence Tsui of The Hollywood Reporter gave the film a positive review, considering it to be a "pretty effective" action comedy; he wrote that despite it not being one of Chan's best films, "at least it accomplishes the film's modest mission."

References

External links

2016 films
2016 action comedy films
2016 comedy films
Chinese action comedy films
Films directed by Ding Sheng
Films set in 1941
Films set in China
Films set on trains
Rail transport films
Second Sino-Japanese War films
Chinese World War II films